This is a list of episodes from the anime series Mobile Fighter G Gundam. The series originally aired on TV Asahi in Japan from April 1, 1994 to March 23, 1995, and later aired on Cartoon Network's Toonami programming block in the United States from August 5 to October 16, 2002. The series uses four pieces of theme music: two openings and two closings. The first opening, used for the first 25 episodes, is "Flying in the Sky" by Hitofumi Ushima, while the closing song is "Umi Yori Mo Fukaku" (Eng. "Deeper Than the Ocean") by Etsuko Sai. For the remaining episodes, the opening is "Trust You Forever" by Hitofumi Ushima and the closing is "Kimi No Naka No Eien" (Eng. "The Eternity in You") by Inoue Takehide.

Episodes

Mobile Fighter G Gundam
G Gundam
Episodes